Batna District is a district of Batna Province, Algeria.

Municipalities
The district is further divided into three municipalities.
Batna
Oued Chaaba
Fesdis

Districts of Batna Province